In cooking, coddled eggs are eggs that have been cracked into a ramekin or another small container, placed in a water bath or bain-marie and gently or lightly cooked just below boiling temperature. They can be partially cooked, mostly cooked, or hardly cooked at all (as in the eggs used to make Caesar salad dressing, which is only slightly poached for a thicker end-product).  Poached eggs are similar to coddled eggs but cooked by submersion in water, rather than being placed in a water bath.

Method 
The inside of the egg coddler is first buttered to flavor the egg and allow it to be removed more easily. A raw egg (sometimes with additional flavorings) is broken into the coddler, which is then placed in a pan of near-boiling water for 7 to 8 minutes to achieve a solid white and runny yolk.

Manufacture 
Coddlers may have been manufactured by Royal Worcester since at least the 1890s. Many companies now make egg coddlers, some of which are collectors’ items.

Possible risks 
Coddled eggs do not always reach temperatures required to sterilize potential contaminants and pathogens. 

In the United States, eggs have around a 1 in 30,000 risk of exposure to salmonella and other bacteria. Using fresh eggs that have been washed and kept refrigerated, or pasteurized eggs is recommended to minimize the risk. According to the United States Department of Health and Human Services, eggs should be cooked until both the white and the yolk are firm, and the water temperature should be . Children, the elderly, and persons with compromised immune systems are advised against eating lightly cooked eggs because of the risk of exposure to salmonella infection. 

In the UK, according to the NHS, raw or lightly cooked eggs bearing the lion mark can be safely eaten by pregnant women, infants and children, and the elderly.

See also 

 Boiled egg
 Egg cup
 List of egg dishes
 Poached egg

References

External links 
 Collectors' information

Egg dishes